Sekou Keita Souza (born 12 December 1994) is a Guinean professional footballer who plays for Aigues Mortes as a forward.

Club career
Born in Conakry, Keita made his senior debut in Spain with Alcobendas CF in 2011, in Tercera División. In 2012, he moved to Atlético Madrid, returning to youth football, and was promoted to the C-team in the summer of 2013.

In June 2014, after appearing regularly, Keita moved to the reserves in Segunda División B. On 18 December he made his first team debut, coming on as a late substitute for goalscorer Mario Mandžukić in a 2–2 home draw against CE L'Hospitalet, for the season's Copa del Rey.

On 7 July 2015, Keita was loaned to Ligue 2 side Evian Thonon Gaillard for one year. After this he remained in France, signing a three-year contract with fellow Ligue 2 side Red Star.

After six month with Ermis Aradippou, in January 2019 he returned in France with Laval. In February 2020, he moved to F91 Dudelange in Luxembourg.

In September 2021 he signed with Serbian club Voždovac.

International career
On 5 June 2015, Keita was called up to Guinea national team for a 2017 Africa Cup of Nations qualification match against Swaziland. He made his full international debut seven days later, starting in the 2–1 defeat.

References

External links

1994 births
Living people
Sportspeople from Conakry
Guinean footballers
Association football forwards
Segunda División B players
Tercera División players
Ligue 2 players
Championnat National 3 players
Championnat National players
Luxembourg National Division players
Cypriot First Division players
Atlético Madrid C players
Atlético Madrid B players
Thonon Evian Grand Genève F.C. players
Red Star F.C. players
Ermis Aradippou FC players
Stade Lavallois players
Horoya AC players
SO Cholet players
F91 Dudelange players
FK Voždovac players
Al-Arabi SC (Kuwait) players
Serbian SuperLiga players
Kuwait Premier League players
Guinea international footballers
Guinean expatriate footballers
Guinean expatriate sportspeople in Spain
Guinean expatriate sportspeople in France
Guinean expatriate sportspeople in Cyprus
Guinean expatriate sportspeople in Luxembourg
Guinean expatriate sportspeople in Serbia
Guinean expatriate sportspeople in Kuwait
Expatriate footballers in Spain
Expatriate footballers in France
Expatriate footballers in Cyprus
Expatriate footballers in Luxembourg
Expatriate footballers in Serbia
Expatriate footballers in Kuwait